The 2001–02 National Division Three North was the second season (fifteenth overall) of the fourth division (north) of the English domestic rugby union competition using the name National Division Three North.  New teams to the division included West Hartlepool who were relegated from the 2000–01 National Division Two while promoted teams included Scunthorpe who were champions of Midlands Division 1 while Darlington Mowden Park (champions) and Blaydon (playoffs) came up from North Division 1.  The league system was 2 points for a win and 1 point for a draw with the promotion system changing for this season with a playoff system being introduced.  The champions of both National Division Three North and National Division Three South would automatically go up but the runners up of these two divisions would meet each other in a one off match (at the home ground of the side with the superior league record) to see who would claim the third and final promotion place to National Division Two for the following season.

After the havoc caused by the previous seasons foot-and-mouth crisis, this year's competition was much more straightforward with all fixtures being fulfilled.  Doncaster were easily the top side in the competition, strolling to the league title with almost a perfect record (they lost just the one game) and gaining promotion to the 2002–03 National Division Two.  As league runners up, Dudley Kingswinford had a tough playoff game away against 2001–02 National Division Three South runners up Launceston who were ultimately too strong for the Midlands side who lost 26 - 0 and had to spend another season in National Division Three North.  Unlike 2000-01 the relegation process was much more straightforward expect that four teams would go down instead of the usual two.  West Hartlepool were the first team to be relegated, suffering their fourth relegation in a row (the north-west club were actually a Premiership team at the start of this slide), followed swiftly by Sandal as easily the two worst sides in the league.  Morley and Whitchurch were the other teams to be relegated, being much more competitive but not having quite enough to stay safe.  West Hartlepool, Sandal and Morley dropped to North Division 1 while Whitchurch went into Midlands Division 1.

Participating teams and locations

Final league table

Results

Round 1

Round 2

Round 3

Round 4

Round 5

Round 6

Round 7 

Postponed.  Game rescheduled to 29 December 2001.

Postponed.  Game rescheduled to 29 December 2001.

Round 8

Round 9

Round 10

Round 11

Round 12

Round 13

Round 14 

Postponed.  Game rescheduled to 16 February 2002.

Postponed.  Game rescheduled to 29 December 2001.

Postponed.  Game rescheduled to 16 February 2002.

Postponed.  Game rescheduled to 16 February 2002.

Postponed.  Game rescheduled to 16 February 2002.

Postponed.  Game rescheduled to 29 December 2001.

Rounds 7 & 14 (rescheduled games) 

Game rescheduled from 3 November 2001.

Game initially rescheduled from 29 December 2001 but postponed again until 16 February 2002.

Game initially rescheduled from 3 November 2001 but postponed again until 2 March 2002.

Game initially rescheduled from 29 December 2001 but postponed again until 16 February 2002.

Round 15 

Postponed.  Game rescheduled to 23 March 2002.

Postponed.  Game rescheduled to 2 March 2002.

Postponed.  Game rescheduled to 2 March 2002.

Postponed.  Game rescheduled to 23 March 2002.

Postponed.  Game rescheduled to 23 March 2002.

Postponed.  Game rescheduled to 23 March 2002.

Postponed.  Game rescheduled to 2 March 2002.

Round 16 

Postponed.  Game rescheduled to 23 March 2002.

Round 17

Round 18 

Postponed.  Game rescheduled to 20 April 2002.

Postponed.  Game rescheduled to 20 April 2002.

Round 19

Round 20

Rounds 7 & 14 (rescheduled games) 

Game rescheduled from 22 December 2001.

Game rescheduled firstly from 22 December 2001 and then from 29 December 2001.

Game rescheduled from 22 December 2001.

Game rescheduled from 22 December 2001.

Game rescheduled from 22 December 2001.

Game initially rescheduled from 3 November 2001 & then 29 December 2001.

Round 21 

Postponed.  Game rescheduled to 27 April 2002.

Postponed.  Game rescheduled to 27 April 2002.

Rounds 14, 15 & 22 (rescheduled games) 

Game rescheduled from 5 January 2002.

Game rescheduled from 5 January 2002.

Game rescheduled from 29 December 2002.

Game brought forward from 9 March 2002.

Game rescheduled from 5 January 2002.

Round 22 

Game brought forward to 2 March 2002.

Round 23

Rounds 15 & 16 (rescheduled games) 

Game rescheduled from 5 January 2002.

Game rescheduled from 5 January 2002.

Game rescheduled from 5 January 2002.

Game rescheduled from 12 January 2002.

Game rescheduled from 5 January 2002.

Round 24

Round 25

Round 26

Round 18 (rescheduled games) 

Game rescheduled from 26 January 2002.

Game rescheduled from 26 January 2002.

Round 21 (rescheduled games) 

Game rescheduled from 23 February 2002.

Game rescheduled from 23 February 2002.

Promotion play-off
The league runners up of National Division Three South and North would meet in a playoff game for promotion to National Division Two.  Launceston were runners-up in the south and because they had a better league record than north runners-up, Dudley Kingswinford, they hosted the play-off match.

Total season attendances

Individual statistics 

 Note that points scorers includes tries as well as conversions, penalties and drop goals.

Top points scorers

Top try scorers

Season records

Team
Largest home win — 83 pts
86 - 3 Doncaster at home to Darlington Mowden Park on 13 April 2002
Largest away win — 61 pts
71 - 0 Dudley Kingswinford away to Sandal on 24 November 2001
Most points scored — 95 pts
95 - 13 Doncaster at home to West Hartlepool on 24 November 2001
Most tries in a match — 15
Doncaster at home to West Hartlepool on 24 November 2001
Most conversions in a match — 10
Doncaster at home to West Hartlepool on 24 November 2001
Most penalties in a match — 6 (x2)
Blaydon at home to New Brighton on 6 October 2001
Scunthorpe at home to Blaydon on 3 November 2001
Most drop goals in a match — 1 (x8)
N/A (multiple teams)

Player
Most points in a match — 35
 Matt Donkin for Doncaster at home to Whitchurch on 10 November 2001
Most tries in a match — 7
 Matt Donkin for Doncaster at home to Whitchurch on 10 November 2001
Most conversions in a match — 10
 John Liley for Doncaster at home to West Hartlepool on 24 November 2001
Most penalties in a match — 6 (x2)
 James Lofthouse for Blaydon at home to New Brighton on 6 October 2001
 Tim Robinson for Scunthorpe at home to Blaydon on 3 November 2001
Most drop goals in a match — 1 (x22)
N/A (multiple players)

Attendances
Highest — 2,000
Doncaster at home to Dudley Kingswinford on 26 January 2002
Lowest — 100 (x2) 
Sandal at home to Dudley Kingswinford on 24 November 2001 and Whitchurch on 16 February 2002
Highest Average Attendance — 1,500  
Doncaster

Lowest Average Attendance — 150
Nuneaton

See also
 English Rugby Union Leagues
 English rugby union system
 Rugby union in England

References

External links
 NCA Rugby

2001–02
2001–02 in English rugby union leagues